Limpach is a village in the commune of Reckange-sur-Mess, in south-western Luxembourg.  , the village had a population of 244.

See also
 List of villages in Luxembourg

Reckange-sur-Mess
Villages in Luxembourg